Zenon Stefaniuk (8 July 1930, in Wojnów – 10 July 1985, in Katowice) was a Polish boxer.

He twice won the gold medal at the European Amateur Boxing Championships in the Bantamweight division at Warsaw 1953 and West Berlin 1955. He participated in the 1956 Summer Olympics in Melbourne but without success.

He was four-time winner of the Polish Boxing Championship (1952–1955), and represented Poland seven times in international matches (six wins, one loss).

References

1930 births
1985 deaths
Boxers at the 1956 Summer Olympics
Olympic boxers of Poland
People from Siedlce County
Sportspeople from Masovian Voivodeship
Polish male boxers
Bantamweight boxers